Frederick or Fred Evans may refer to:

 Frederick H. Evans (1853–1943), British photographer, primarily of architectural subjects
 Frederick Evans (hydrographer) (1815–1885), Royal Navy officer and hydrographer
 Fred Evans (comedian) (1889–1951), British music hall and silent movie comedian
 Fred Evans (defensive tackle) (Frederick H. Evans, born 1983), American football defensive tackle
 Fred Evans (running back) (1921–2007), American football player for the Chicago Bears
 Fred Evans (boxer) (born 1991), Welsh  boxer
 Fred Evans (radical militant), leader of an American radical militant group that helped plan and execute the Glenville Shootout riot in 1968
 Fred Evans (union worker) (1881–1912), Australian unionist who died in the Waihi miners' strike of 1912
 Fred Evans (philosopher) (born 1944), American continental philosopher
 Frederick Mullett Evans (1803–1870), English printer and publisher, father-in-law of Charles Dickens, Jr.
 Frederick William Evans (1808–1893), Shaker writer
 Fred P. Evans (1862–?), British spiritualist medium

See also
 William Frederick Evans , 19th-century English entomologist who worked on Odonata and Orthoptera